Sandip Nandy (born 15 January 1975) is a former indian professional footballer who played as a goalkeeper. He is currently the goalkeeping coach of I-League club Mohammedan.

Nandy also appeared with West Bengal team in the 46th edition (2009–10 season) of Santosh Trophy. In the final on 8 August 2010, they clinched the title edging past Punjab 2–1 at the Vivekananda Yuba Bharati Krirangan.

Statistics

International
Statistics accurate as of 27 March 2013.

Honours

India
SAFF Championship: 2005; runner-up: 2013

East Bengal
ASEAN Club Championship: 2003

References

External links
 Indian Super League profile

Indian footballers
1975 births
Footballers from West Bengal
Living people
India international footballers
India youth international footballers
I-League players
Indian Super League players
I-League 2nd Division players
Calcutta Football League players
Association football goalkeepers
Kerala Blasters FC draft picks
Footballers at the 2006 Asian Games
Mohun Bagan AC players
East Bengal Club players
Mahindra United FC players
United SC players
Churchill Brothers FC Goa players
Kerala Blasters FC players
Mumbai FC players
Southern Samity players
Asian Games competitors for India
Association football goalkeeping coaches
Tollygunge Agragami FC players